Raman (Urdu: راماں) is a town in Gujar Khan Tehsil Punjab, Pakistan. Raman is also the chief town of Union Council Raman which is an administrative subdivision of the Tehsil.

References
Raja Muhammad Badar BSIT

Populated places in Gujar Khan Tehsil
Union councils of Gujar Khan Tehsil